The Mirror Universe is the setting of several narratives in the Star Trek science fiction franchise, a parallel universe existing alongside, but separate from, the fictional universe that is the main setting of Star Trek. It resembles the main Star Trek universe, but is populated by more violent and opportunistic doppelgängers of its people. The Mirror Universe has been visited in one episode of Star Trek: The Original Series, five episodes of Star Trek: Deep Space Nine, a two-part episode of Star Trek: Enterprise, a storyline woven through the first season of Star Trek: Discovery (continuing with a Mirror Universe character in the main cast of seasons 2 and 3), and several non-canon Star Trek tie-in works. It is named after "Mirror, Mirror", the Original Series episode in which it first appeared.

Characteristics
The characters in the Mirror Universe are aggressive, mistrustful and opportunistic in personality. Whereas the Star Trek universe depicts an optimistic future in which the Earth-based United Federation of Planets values peace, co-operation and exploration, episodes set in the Mirror Universe feature the human-dominated authoritarian Terran Empire which values war, despotism and conquest instead. Humans in the Mirror Universe are typically referred to as "Terrans".

In Star Trek: Discovery, it is stated that humans from the Mirror Universe suffer from photophobia (a sensitivity to light).

Television appearances

The Original Series
The Mirror Universe was first introduced in the original Star Trek episode "Mirror, Mirror", which featured a brutal Empire, managed by humans and their Vulcan allies, in place of the United Federation of Planets. The Mirror Captain Kirk of the ISS Enterprise was a mass murderer who was promoted to Captain after assassinating Captain Christopher Pike. Discipline aboard starships was enforced through agony booths and agonizers carried by crewmembers. Officers were barbaric in behavior and advanced in rank by killing superiors who they thought were incompetent. Nazi-style military salutes were used by crewmembers to show loyalty to their captain. The episode popularized the trope of using a goatee as a visual marker for an evil version of a character.

Episodes

Deep Space Nine
The Mirror Universe was later revisited in the Deep Space Nine second-season episode "Crossover", and turned into a story arc that spanned into the final season, with five Mirror Universe episodes over the course of five seasons. The series reveals that when exposed to individuals from the normal universe, the Terran Empire began to reform itself for the better, but was overthrown in the 23rd century by an alliance of alien species who took advantage of the Empire's self-weakening and conquered it, enslaving humans and Vulcans in the process.

Episodes

Enterprise
A two-part episode of Star Trek: Enterprise, entitled "In a Mirror, Darkly", introduces the early developments of the Mirror Universe.

Episodes

Discovery
The first season of Star Trek: Discovery has a storyline involving the Mirror Universe. Captain Gabriel Lorca, commander of the USS Discovery, is discovered to be an inhabitant of the Mirror Universe on account of his intolerance to bright light, a genetic trait common to all humans from the Mirror Universe.

In 2018, Comic Book Resources rated Discovery's Mirror Universe saga as the 18th best multi-part episode story of Star Trek.

Episodes

Appearances in other media
In addition to the television episodes, a number of ancillary tie-in works make use of the Mirror Universe setting. These works may contradict continuity as established in the television episodes, and are not considered canon.

Novels

Star Trek: Stargazer
The Star Trek: Stargazer novel Three by Michael Jan Friedman features the Mirror Universe.

Dark Mirror
The Star Trek: The Next Generation book Dark Mirror, written by Diane Duane, offers another explanation of what happened after Captain Kirk and three of his crew encountered the Mirror Universe. In the novel, the Empire is still in existence in the 24th century. The point of divergence initially appears to be the Eugenics Wars where the genetic supermen were not defeated and eventually turned on each other resulting in atomic war, but works dating back to the days of ancient Greece supporting the Empire's current mindset are noted.

Shatnerverse
Various novels have been set in the Deep Space Nine version of the Mirror Universe, including a trilogy by William Shatner, which reveals the Mirror Kirk (or "Emperor Tiberius" as he calls himself) is still alive and plotting to reconquer the Empire.

Star Trek: Mirror Universe
Two collections of Mirror stories were published in 2007: the first involves Mirror Enterprise, TOS and TNG and the second features Mirror DS9, Voyager and New Frontier.

A third collection, entitled Shards and Shadows, was released in January 2009. The Mirror Universe storyline was concluded in the novel Rise Like Lions, released in November 2011. A further story taking place in the Mirror Universe, Section 31 - Disavowed, was released in October 2014.

Games
A number of Star Trek games take place in the Mirror Universe or reference it. Among them, the first-person shooter Star Trek: Voyager – Elite Force, the massively multiplayer online game Star Trek Online, the battle simulator Star Trek: Shattered Universe which is entirely set in the Mirror Universe, Decipher's Star Trek Roleplaying Game and Star Trek: Attack Wing.

Comics

The concept of a morally inverted universe had been pioneered by DC Comics in 1964, three years before Star Trek adopted the idea, in the Justice League of America story "Crisis on Earth-Three" written by Gardner Fox.
The Mirror Universe Saga is a trade paperback that reprints eight issues of DC Comics' Star Trek comic book (issues #9-16) chronicling an encounter between the Mirror Universe and the Prime Universe. It is set immediately after the events of Star Trek III: The Search for Spock. The series was written by Mike W. Barr and drawn by Tom Sutton & Ricardo Villagrán. This version postulates the divergence of history to start at the time of the Earth-Romulan War, with the conquest of Earth by the Romulans; after Earth's liberation, the resistance became an empire-building government.

From 2017 to 2018, IDW Publishing published three limited series set in the Mirror Universe: Mirror Broken (2017), Through the Mirror (2018), and Terra Incognita (2018). These series focused on Jean-Luc Picard and the crew of the ISS Enterprise. A new limited series, entitled Mirror War, was first published in 2021. It follows Picard's ongoing galactic conquest which draws the attention of the Klingon-Cardassian Alliance.

Web series
The fan-produced web series Star Trek Continues included an episode set in the Mirror Universe called "Fairest of Them All".

References

External links
 Mirror Universe article at Memory Alpha, a Star Trek wiki

Fictional dimensions
Mirror Universe (Star Trek)
Star Trek locations